Torrington may refer to:

People
 Arthur Torrington, Guyanese-born co-founder of the Windrush Foundation and the Equiano Society
 Jeff Torrington, Scottish writer
 John Torrington, English explorer and Royal Navy stoker
 George Byng, 1st Viscount Torrington, British naval officer and statesman

Places

Australia
 Torrington, New South Wales
 Torrington, Queensland

Canada
 Torrington, Alberta

United Kingdom
 Black Torrington, a village in Devon
 East Torrington, a small village in Lincolnshire
 Great Torrington, a market town in north Devon
 Little Torrington, a village in Devon
 West Torrington, a small village in Lincolnshire
 Torrington (UK Parliament constituency), in Devon

United States
 Torrington, Connecticut
 Torrington, Wyoming
 Westford- Nabnasset (Torrington Lane), Massachusetts

Other uses
Battle of Torrington, fought in 1646 during the English Civil War
Earl of Torrington, a title in the British peerage
Viscount Torrington, a title in the British peerage
HMS Torrington, the name of four ships of the Royal Navy
SS Torrington, British collier built in 1905, sunk by German submarine in April 1917
Torrington, a sailing brig built in 1847 in Nova Scotia, which sank in New Zealand in 1851
Torrington F.C., football club in Great Torrington, Devon
Torrington railway station, Devon
Torrington Company, Antifriction Bearing Company

See also
 Thorrington